Events in the year 1612 in India.

Events
 The Battle of Swally took place.

References

 
India